Raiwind is a tehsil located in Lahore District, Punjab, Pakistan. The population is  855,626 according to the 2017 census.

Settlements
Lahore Metropolitan Corporation
Raiwind

See also 
 List of tehsils of Punjab, Pakistan

References 

 
Tehsils of Punjab, Pakistan
Populated places in Lahore District